The National Museum and Research Center of Altamira is a center dedicated to the conservation of, research into and the sharing of information about the cave of Altamira in Santillana del Mar (Cantabria, Spain), named a World Heritage Site by Unesco.

The museum offers prehistoric technology workshops to visitors, as well as a permanent exhibition called Times of Altamira, which contains objects from Altamira as well as those from other palaeolithic caves of Cantabria such as El Morín, El Juyo and El Rascaño. The New Altamira Cave, or Neocave, is also part of this exhibition: an artificial replica of the original caves, built in order to preserve the originals from damage arising from a massive influx of visitors.

See also 
 List of museums in Spain

External links 
 Official web

Altamira
Cantabrian culture
History of Cantabria
Archaeological museums in Spain
Buildings and structures in Cantabria
Replica caves
Tourist attractions in Cantabria
Museums in Cantabria